The 2020 A Lyga was the 31st season of the A Lyga, the top-tier football league of Lithuania. The season began on 6 March and was planned to end on 7 November 2020. On 12 March all sports events were postponed for two weeks in the light of the COVID-19 pandemic.

Teams

FK Sūduva Marijampolė begin the season as defending champions having won their third consecutive league title last year.

Three clubs dropped out of A Lyga last season - Stumbras folded in the summer, while Atlantas and Palanga were disqualified after the end of the season after investigation revealed numerous match-fixing incidents.

Licensing process
The top 5 previous season's teams - FK Sūduva Marijampolė, FK Žalgiris, FK Riteriai, FK Kauno Žalgiris and FK Panevėžys met licensing criteria and received a straight pass to their licenses. Disqualified FK Palanga and FK Atlantas appealed the disqualification decision and expressed interest in playing in A Lyga. Their appeals were rejected. 

Five of the I Lyga teams applied for A Lyga licenses - FK Banga Gargždai, FC Džiugas, Vilniaus Vytis, DFK Dainava and FC Hegelmann Litauen. The previous year's I Lyga winners FC Džiugas failed to meet A Lyga licensing criteria, and their application was rejected. FC Džiugas will continue playing in I Lyga this season. FK Banga Gargždai won the play-off match against FK Palanga and earned the right to play in A Lyga. Their A Lyga license was granted upon appeal. Vilniaus Vytis and DFK Dainava did not earn promotion to A Lyga, however they were hoping for exceptions which are common in Lithuanian football. In this instance their applications were rejected on the grounds of failing to meet several critical criteria. FC Hegelmann Litauen withdrew their application prior to the licensing committee's meeting. This meant that only six teams will play in the 2020 A Lyga championship. The LFF announced that four I Lyga teams will qualify for promotion to A Lyga next season.

Personnel and kits

Managerial changes

Regular season
On 12 March all sports events were postponed for two weeks in the light of the coronavirus pandemic.

League table

Fixtures and results

Rounds 1–10

Rounds 11–20

Season statistics

Top scorers

See also
 2020 LFF I Lyga
 Football in Lithuania
 2020 Lithuanian Football Cup

References

External links
 

LFF Lyga seasons
2020 in Lithuanian football
Lithuania
Lithuania
A Lyga